The Orto Botanico di Palermo (Palermo Botanical Garden) is both a botanical garden  and a research and educational institution of the Department of Botany of the University of Palermo.

Brief history

The earliest beginnings of the gardens go back to 1779, when  the Accademia dei Regi Studi created the chair of  "Botany and medicinal properties". A modest plot of land was allocated to develop a small botanical garden dedicated to the cultivation of plants with medicinal benefits, for the twin objectives of general learning and improving public health.

Initially a site near Porta Carini utilized a site of the former fortified bastions facing the seaside from the walls of the city. These bastions were demolished in 1774-1778 under the praetorship of Antonino La Grua Talamanca, marchese de Regalmici, and later Prince of Carini, and reassigned for the botanical gardens. This initial garden allotment soon proved too small, and in 1786 it was decided to move to the present site, right next to the Piano di Sant'Erasmo, best remembered for the unfortunate events that occurred there during the Spanish Inquisition. The site had been orchards belonging to the former villa Giulia. Patronizing the development was the praetor Bernardo Filangieri, count of San Marco and the noblemen Giovanni Battista Paterno Asmondo and Ignazio Vanni.

In 1789 construction of the main part of the administrative buildings of the garden commenced in a neoclassical style. It is constructed with a central building, the Gymnasium, and two side buildings, the Tepidariumand the Caldarium, designed by the Frenchman Léon Dufourny, who had also designed a part of the oldest section of garden, right next to the Gymnasium. Its rectangular layout is divided into four quadrangles, within which the species are categorised according to Carl Linnaeus' system of classification. The new garden was opened in 1795; in the ensuing years it was improved,  with the Aquarium (1798), a great pool  hosting numerous species of aquatic plants, and the serra Maria Carolina (or Maria Carolina glasshouse), completed in 1823. The huge Ficus macrophylla, which is an emblem and a well-known attraction of the modern garden, was imported from Norfolk Island (Australia), in 1845.  Today's area, some 10 hectares, was reached in 1892, following successive extensions. In 1913 the Giardino coloniale (Colonial garden) was developed alongside the botanic gardens, but that no longer exists.  The gardens have been managed by the Department of Botany since 1985.

 Chronological listing of the directors of the gardens

Buildings, features and the collection

Gymnasium, Calidarium and Tepidarium
The central neo-classical building, known as the Gymnasium, is located near the main entrance gate.  Originally it was the main office of the  Schola Regia Botanice (school of botany), the Herbarium, the library and the director's office.

Two smaller buildings are located either side of the Gymnasium in perfect symmetry.  To this day they are called the Calidarium and the Tepidarium  because originally they housed plants from warm and temperate zones respectively (caldo meaning "hot" in Italian).

Linneian section
This is the oldest section of the gardens, laid out in a rectangular shape and divided into four quadrangles, the  "quatrains" (or quartini).  Each quatrain is further divided into flowerbeds, within which the plants were originally organised along the lines of the Linneian system of classification. The design of this section has gradually changed over time to display certain specimens at the expense of others that are now gone.  At the centre of this section, is the particularly evocative “cross”, the small plaza that results from the intersection of the central axis (the Viale centrale) with the tree lined avenue of palms (the Viale delle palme).

The Aquarium and other water features

The Aquarium, a large round pool divided into 24 sections, is located at the end of the central avenue.  The design consists of three concentric rings which are divided into 8 wedges, each being a home to a variety of acqautic flora.

The "lagoon" is located a few metres further down from the Acquariam  and is another ample water feature in which the plants are arranged informally. Other smaller ponds are located in the quatrains of the Linneian section.

The greenhouses

Over time the gardens have benefitted from the development of a series of greenhouses that currently comprise a surface area of some 1,300 mq.

The oldest of these greenhouses is the  serra  Maria Carolina (serra is Italian for greenhouse), a gift from Queen Maria Carolina of Austria, also known as the Giardino d'Inverno (the winter garden). Originally it was constructed of wood and heated by stoves,  over the course of the second half of the 19th century, it was completely rebuilt of cast-iron.

Other greenhouses include:
the greenhouse of succulents, containing plants from hot-arid zones;
the experimental greenhouse, that currently house bananas and papaya ;
the greenhouse of the region, containing plants of the warm-humid zones;
the greenhouse for the preservation of succulents, an annex of the Department of Botany;
the greenhouse of ferns.

Bioecological and geographic zone
In this section plants are arranged according to bioecological and geographic criteria.   Here one finds the Giardino a succulente ("Garden of succulents"), consisting of an assortment of plants from the arid zones of Africa; the Palmetum; the Cycadetum; e la collinetta mediterranea (mediterranean hillside) which includes various significant species endemic to the Mediterranean, including some specimens which represent rare and endangered species.

Experimental and research zone
In the experimental zone, situated to the side of the Winter Garden, tropical and subtropical plants are cultivated for the purposes of research.  Studies currently in train or recently undertaken include those on cotton, vegetables, sugar cane and sorghum. The zone dedicated to plants of a practical application, which extends  over the south west part of the gardens, consists of terrain set apart for plants yielding a variety of oils, resins and fibres.

Engler's zone
Also known as the nuovo settore (the new zone), it comprises the southern section of the gardens within which the plants are arranged in accordance with the classification system of Engler. The species are partitioned into three sections, each dedicated in turn to the gymnosperms, the angiosperms, the dicotyledons and the  liliopsida.

The herbarium
The modern  Herbarium mediterraneum, accommodated within a few buildings adjacent to the gardens, covers a surface area of some 6,000 m2.

The main part of the collection comprises the  Erbario Siculo and the Erbario Generale of the Department of Botany, estimated to be around 50,000 and 200,000 specimens respectively.   Of the latter group, around a quarter represent plants native to the mediterranean.

The non Sicilian specimens are mainly from Portugal, Spain, France, Corsica, Sardinia, Greece, Crete, Cyprus, Algeria and Egypt.

It also includes around 2,000 specimens of algae, 1,600 of lichen, 4,700 of bryophyte and a thousand odd of fungus.

Gene bank

The gene bank, having been started in 1993, is part of a broader project to protect the genetic material  of the region's flora.

The main objective of the bank is the conservation ex situ, both short and long term, of all seeds endemic to the region, rare or endangered.  Once they have been collected, the seeds are immediately treated and conserved in ampoules, all managed by the institution and available for exchange with others. The seeds are periodically tested for their propensity to germinate.

The bank forms part of the RIBES network (Rete Italiana delle Banche per la conservazione Ex-Situ del germoplasma).

Summary of the species present

(See also the full list of species of plants growing in the gardens further below).

The gardens are currently home to at least 12,000 different species.

Having been developed during the great age of exploration, between the second half of the 19th century and the first decades of the 20th century the gardens became an important point of reference for the bigger botanical gardens of Northern Europe.  Because of Palermo's favourable climate,  they transferred a good number of unknown, poorly classified and exotic tropical species there. In this context, the relationship between the Berlin Botanic Garden, under the stewardship of Adolf Engler, and those of the originating areas of the new world proved to be extremely important.

As an illustrative example of the role of the Palermo Botanic Garden, consider the introduction into the  Mediterranean of the mandarin (Citrus deliciosa) and the loquat  (Eriobotrya japonica).

The early Linneian plantings  consisted of 1,580 different species, of which 658 still exist. Of these specimens, the most notable is the mighty Ginkgo biloba.

In the Aquarium many species of Nymphaea are to be found, including Nymphaea alba, Nymphaea tuberosa hybrids of Nymphaea × marliacea, the multicoloured Nuphar lutea and Nelumbum nucifera. Moreover, in the areas further in that are not submerged but humid nevertheless, one finds Alocasia, Colocasia, Zantedeschia, while in a nearby pond, the so-called laghetto,   Egyptian papyrus (Cyperus papyrus) and other cyperaceae such as Scirpus lacustris and  Cyperus alternifolius are absolutely thriving.

Various species of bamboo grow nearby and directly behind here, atop a small artificial hill, there is a healthy specimen of the drago tree (Dracaena draco).  Not too far away one can see the tallest plant of the gardens, a magnificent Araucaria columnaris, and the largest overall in terms of volume, a gigantic specimen of  Ficus macrophylla, with its typical aerial roots, imported from Norfolk Island (a territory of Australia in the Pacific Ocean), in 1845.  It is also a native of the east coast of Australia and is known as the Moreton Bay Fig.

The giardino a succulente (the garden of succulents) of the bioecological zone is home to numerous species of the genus Aloe and various other plants of arid regions, including Cereus, Crassula, Euphorbia and Opuntia.  Alongside the collection of succulents, there is a huge specimen of Ficus rubiginosa, recreating an environment reminiscent of a tropical jungle.

In the area containing Cycadetum there are certain species of Cycadales that have a notable history. Of these we have Cycas revoluta, donated by Queen Maria Carolina in 1793, was the first such specimen to find a permanent home in Europe. In the following stage of the gardens' development Zamiaceae Ceratozamia mexicana and Dioon edule, were both introduced from Mexico, as was Cycas circinalis, an elegant species from the Indian sub-continent.  In 1997 the collection was further improved by the acquisition of a variety of worthy specimens, including Dioon spinulosum,  Encephalartos altensteinii, Encephalartos longifolius, Encephalartos villosus, Macrozamia moorei and Zamia furfuracea.

In the area dedicated to palms one can find Chamaerops humilis, the only palm  native to Sicily, and numerous exotic palms, in which the gardens are particularly blessed.  Amongst both potted and fully cultivated specimens,  one can count a good 34 genera and around 80 species. The genus Washingtonia is represented by W. filifera, that flowered in Palermo for the first time ever,  and by W. robusta. In the genus Phoenix, apart from the common date  (Phoenix dactylifera) there are also P. rupicola, P. reclinata,  P. canariensis,  P. roebelenii and P. teophrastii. There are also many other genera: Chamaedorea, Brahea, Sabal, Erythea, Livistona, Howea and Trachycarpus.

The Giardino d'Inverno (Winter Garden) is home to a number of species native to the warmer climes of  Africa, Central America, South America, Asia and Australia. Amongst those that are worth a brief mention, we have the coffee plant (Coffea arabica), papaya (Carica papaya), numerous species of Bougainvillea,   cinnamon (Cinnamomum ceylanicum), (Parmentiera cereifera) and mimosa (Mimosa spegazzinii). In the  serra della Regione (glasshouse of the regions), there are potted specimens of (Ravenala madagascariensis)  (the traveller's palm) and various species of Anthurium, Codiaeum, Pandanus and other plants from tropical and equatorial climes. Two smaller glasshouses are located alongside this one, housing orchids and carnivorous plants respectively.  Also notable is the collection of succulents contained in the similarly titled glasshouse, amongst which we find specimens of  Echinocactus grusonii of considerable dimensions.

In the  Settore Sperimentale e delle Piante Utili  (Experimental zone and zone of practical plantings) plants which produce foodstuffs are exhibited, such as sugarcane (Saccharum officinarum) and (Sorghum saccharatum), both used for the production of sugar; avocado (Persea americana),  various cultivars of banana (Musa acuminata × balbisiana), pecan nut, not to mention an extensive collection of vegetable plants with over 100 cultivars of great historical interest and hugely important in terms of the conservation of a local gene pool. Lastly we have the medicinal plantings, including Artemisia absinthium,  Datura stramonium, ginseng (Withania somnifera), la camphour (Cinnamomum camphora) and the opium poppy (Papaver somniferum).

Odd spot 
For a few years now the gardens have been home to a colony of parrots of the species Psittacula krameri, having escaped from the aviaries of the nearby Villa Giulia and are perfectly at home in the subtropical habitat of the gardens.

Useful information
The gardens are open to visitors during the working week from 9.00am to 5.00pm (from April to October to 6.00pm). 
Weekend hours are from  8.30am to 1.30pm.

E-mail: info@ortobotanico.palermo.it

See also

Palermo
Botanical garden
List of botanical gardens in Italy

References

Lima A.I.. L'Orto Botanico di Palermo. S.F.Flaccovio Editore, Palermo 1978
Raimondo F.M., Di Martino A., Mazzola P. L' orto botanico di Palermo. La flora dei tropici nel cuore del mediterraneo.  Arbor Editore, 1993  
Raimondo F.M., Scialabba A.  - The role and function of germplasm in the context of the Palermo Botanical Garden. Giorn. Bot. Ital.,1994; 128(1): 414.

External links
Home page of the Department of Botany, University of Palermo (in Italian)
Article on the gardens in PROMETHEUS, a periodical focusing on cultural matters (in Italian)
Official site of the gardens (in Italian and English)

Palermo
Neoclassical architecture in Palermo
Gardens in Palermo
Buildings and structures in Palermo
Gene banks